Midori Kono Thiel (born June 7, 1933 in Berkeley, California) is a Japanese American calligrapher based in Seattle. She grew up on Maui. She received her bachelor of arts and master of fine arts from the University of California, Berkeley. She has exhibited  at the De Young Museum, San Francisco; Tokyo Metropolitan Art Museum; Seattle Art Museum; Portland Art Museum; Henry Art Gallery, Seattle; Cheney Cowles Art Museum, Spokane; and the Wing Luke Museum of the Asian Pacific American Experience, Seattle.

A 2015 exhibit at the Wing Luke Museum featured Kono's painting and calligraphy in combination with her daughter Tamiko's augmented reality art.

Bibliography and other works

References

External links

1933 births
American artists of Japanese descent
American calligraphers
American women painters
Artists from Seattle
Living people
University of California, Berkeley alumni
Women calligraphers
21st-century American women artists